Alice Seymour-Conway, Viscountess Beauchamp (10 May 1749 – 11 February 1772), formerly the Hon. Alice Elizabeth Windsor, was the first wife of Francis Ingram-Seymour-Conway, Viscount Beauchamp, later Marquess of Hertford.

She was the second daughter and co-heiress of Herbert Windsor, 2nd Viscount Windsor, by his wife, the former Alice Clavering. She married Viscount Beauchamp, then MP for Lostwithiel, on 4 February 1768 in London 

She died at the couple's house in Grosvenor Square, London, aged 22.

Her husband married again, his second wife being the 16-year-old the Hon. Isabella Ingram, who later became a mistress of the Prince of Wales.

References

1749 births
1772 deaths
Beauchamp
Daughters of viscounts
Peerage of Ireland